is a Japanese professional golfer.

Serizawa played on the Japan Golf Tour, winning five times.

Professional wins (7)

Japan Golf Tour wins (5)

Japan Golf Tour playoff record (0–4)

Other wins (1)
1987 Acom Team Championship (with Tomohiro Maruyama)

Japan PGA Senior Tour wins (1)
2010 Fuji Film Senior Championship

Results in major championships

CUT = missed the halfway cut
Note: Serizawa only played in The Open Championship.

Team appearances
World Cup (representing Japan): 1991
Alfred Dunhill Cup (representing Japan): 1987, 1994, 1995, 1998
Four Tours World Championship (representing Japan): 1988, 1990

See also
Serizawa Nobuo no Birdie Try (Super Famicom video game endorsed by Nobuo Serizawa)

External links

Japanese male golfers
Japan Golf Tour golfers
Sportspeople from Shizuoka Prefecture
1959 births
Living people